Cottus petiti, also called the chabot du Lez in French, is a species of freshwater ray-finned fish belonging to the family Cottidae, the typical sculpins. It is endemic to France, found only in a small 3 km stretch of the river Lez in Southern France near Montpellier.  The natural habitat is fed by karstic springs which may have enabled the isolated survival of the population through geoglogical history. Now the species may be threatened by habitat loss. The males of this species are typically 56 mm in length. This species was confirmed as a separate species from the European bullhead (C. gobio) in 2005 by Jörg Freyhof, Maurice Kottelat and Arne W. Nolte. The specific name honours the zoologist and anatomist  of the Muséum national d’Histoire naturelle.

It is part of the Cottus gobio complex, and genetically very close to C. gobio.

References 

Freshwater fish of Europe
Cottus (fish)
Endemic fish of Metropolitan France
Fish described in 1964
Taxonomy articles created by Polbot